Harrowby Hall is a Grade II* listed building in Harrowby, Lincolnshire, England.

The Hall was the family home of the Ryder family and the former home of Nathaniel Ryder, 1st Baron Harrowby. It was purchased from the Rolt family by Sir Dudley Ryder in 1754.

From 1935 to 1971 Harrowby Estate contained 59 smallholdings as part of the Land Settlement Association scheme.

References

External links
 "Harrowby", Genuki.org.uk. Retrieved 18 August 2011

Grade II* listed buildings in Lincolnshire
Buildings and structures in Grantham
Ryder family